This is a list of Piciformes species by global population. While numbers are estimates, they have been made by the experts in their fields. For more information on how these estimates were ascertained, see Wikipedia's articles on population biology and population ecology.

This list is not comprehensive, as not all Piciformes have had their numbers quantified.

Species by global population

See also
 
Lists of birds by population
Lists of organisms by population

References

Birds
Piciformes